Sahitya Akademi Translation Prizes are given each year to writers for their outstanding translations work in the 24 languages, since 1989.

Recipients  
Following is the list of recipients of Sahitya Akademi translation prizes for their works written in Malayalam. The award, as of 2019, consisted of 50,000.

See also 
 List of Sahitya Akademi Award winners for Malayalam

References

External links
 Akademi Translation Prizes For Malayalam Language

Malayalam
Indian literary awards